Pablo Cuevas was the defending champion but chose not to defend his title.

Corentin Moutet won the title after defeating Pedro Cachín 6–4, 6–4 in the final.

Seeds

Draw

Finals

Top half

Bottom half

References

External links
Main draw
Qualifying draw

Open Sopra Steria de Lyon - 1
2022 Singles